Wirawan Ruamsuk (born 11 March 1980) is a Thai sprinter. She competed in the women's 4 × 100 metres relay at the 2000 Summer Olympics.

References

1980 births
Living people
Athletes (track and field) at the 2000 Summer Olympics
Wirawan Ruamsuk
Wirawan Ruamsuk
Place of birth missing (living people)
Olympic female sprinters
Wirawan Ruamsuk